The Möller–Trumbore ray-triangle intersection algorithm, named after its inventors Tomas Möller and Ben Trumbore, is a fast method for calculating the intersection of a ray and a triangle in three dimensions without needing precomputation of the plane equation of the plane containing the triangle. Among other uses, it can be used in computer graphics to implement ray tracing computations involving triangle meshes.

Calculation

Definitions 
The ray is defined by an origin point  and a direction vector .

Check if the ray is parallel to the triangle 
First, find out if the ray intersects with the plane that the triangle is on, and if it does, find the coordinates of that intersection. The only way that the ray will not intersect the plane is if the ray's direction vector is parallel to the plane. When this happens, the dot product between the ray's direction vector and the plane's normal vector will be zero. Otherwise, the ray does intersect the plane somewhere, but not necessarily within the triangle.

Check if the ray-plane intersection lies outside the triangle 
Using barycentric coordinates, any point on the triangle can be expressed as a convex combination of the triangle's verticies: 

The coefficients must be non-negative and sum to 1, so w can be replaced with :

, where  is any point on the plane.

This happens if and only if the triangle verticies aren't collinear and the ray isn't parallel to the plane.

C++ implementation
The following is an implementation of the algorithm in C++:
bool RayIntersectsTriangle(Vector3D rayOrigin, 
                           Vector3D rayVector, 
                           Triangle* inTriangle,
                           Vector3D& outIntersectionPoint)
{
    const float EPSILON = 0.0000001;
    Vector3D vertex0 = inTriangle->vertex0;
    Vector3D vertex1 = inTriangle->vertex1;  
    Vector3D vertex2 = inTriangle->vertex2;
    Vector3D edge1, edge2, h, s, q;
    float a,f,u,v;
    edge1 = vertex1 - vertex0;
    edge2 = vertex2 - vertex0;
    h = rayVector.crossProduct(edge2);
    a = edge1.dotProduct(h);
    if (a > -EPSILON && a < EPSILON)
        return false;    // This ray is parallel to this triangle.
    f = 1.0/a;
    s = rayOrigin - vertex0;
    u = f * s.dotProduct(h);
    if (u < 0.0 || u > 1.0)
        return false;
    q = s.crossProduct(edge1);
    v = f * rayVector.dotProduct(q);
    if (v < 0.0 || u + v > 1.0)
        return false;
    // At this stage we can compute t to find out where the intersection point is on the line.
    float t = f * edge2.dotProduct(q);
    if (t > EPSILON) // ray intersection
    {
        outIntersectionPoint = rayOrigin + rayVector * t;
        return true;
    }
    else // This means that there is a line intersection but not a ray intersection.
        return false;
}

Java implementation
The following is an implementation of the algorithm in Java using javax.vecmath from Java 3D API:
public class MollerTrumbore {

    private static final double EPSILON = 0.0000001;

    public static boolean rayIntersectsTriangle(Point3d rayOrigin, 
                                                Vector3d rayVector,
                                                Triangle inTriangle,
                                                Point3d outIntersectionPoint) {
        Point3d vertex0 = inTriangle.getVertex0();
        Point3d vertex1 = inTriangle.getVertex1();
        Point3d vertex2 = inTriangle.getVertex2();
        Vector3d edge1 = new Vector3d();
        Vector3d edge2 = new Vector3d();
        Vector3d h = new Vector3d();
        Vector3d s = new Vector3d();
        Vector3d q = new Vector3d();
        double a, f, u, v;
        edge1.sub(vertex1, vertex0);
        edge2.sub(vertex2, vertex0);
        h.cross(rayVector, edge2);
        a = edge1.dot(h);
        if (a > -EPSILON && a < EPSILON) {
            return false;    // This ray is parallel to this triangle.
        }
        f = 1.0 / a;
        s.sub(rayOrigin, vertex0);
        u = f * (s.dot(h));
        if (u < 0.0 || u > 1.0) {
            return false;
        }
        q.cross(s, edge1);
        v = f * rayVector.dot(q);
        if (v < 0.0 || u + v > 1.0) {
            return false;
        }
        // At this stage we can compute t to find out where the intersection point is on the line.
        double t = f * edge2.dot(q);
        if (t > EPSILON) // ray intersection
        {
            outIntersectionPoint.set(0.0, 0.0, 0.0);
            outIntersectionPoint.scaleAdd(t, rayVector, rayOrigin);
            return true;
        } else // This means that there is a line intersection but not a ray intersection.
        {
            return false;
        }
    }
}

See also 
 Badouel intersection algorithm
 MATLAB version of this algorithm (highly vectorized)
 Baldwin-Weber ray-triangle intersection algorithm
 Schlick–Subrenat algorithm for ray-quadrilateral intersection

Links 
 Fast Minimum Storage Ray-Triangle Intersection
 Optimizations on the basic algorithm by Möller & Trumbore, code from journal of graphics tools
 Ray-Tracing: Rendering a Triangle

References 

Geometric algorithms
Geometric intersection